Lischkeia reginamaris is a species of sea snail, a marine gastropod mollusk in the family Eucyclidae.

Distribution
This marine species occurs off the Philippines.

References

External links
 To Encyclopedia of Life
 To World Register of Marine Species

reginamaris
Gastropods described in 1981